The Netherlands was represented by Ruth Jacott, with the song "Vrede", at the 1993 Eurovision Song Contest, which took place in Millstreet, Ireland on 15 May. The song was chosen at the Dutch national final on 26 March.

Before Eurovision

Nationaal Songfestival 1993 
The final took place on 26 March 1993 at the Discothèque Escape in Amsterdam, hosted by Paul de Leeuw. All eight songs were performed by Jacott, with the winner being decided by juries in the twelve Dutch provinces, who awarded votes as 10-8-6-5-4-3-2-1. (For reasons which are unclear, on the night the votes were announced in multiples of 1,000 - i.e. the favourite song was awarded 10,000 points.) "Vrede" won by a 7-point margin, having been ranked first by four of the juries.

At Eurovision 
On the night of the final Jacott performed 20th in the running order, following the United Kingdom and preceding Croatia. At the close of voting "Vrede" had received 92 points from 14 countries, placing the Netherlands 6th of the 25 entries. The Dutch jury awarded its 12 points to Portugal.

Voting

References

External links 
 Netherlands preselection 1993

1993
Countries in the Eurovision Song Contest 1993
Eurovision